St Giles in the Fields is the Anglican parish church of the St Giles district of London. The parish stands within the London Borough of Camden and forms part of the Diocese of London. The church, named for St Giles the Hermit, began as the chapel of a 12th Century monastery and leper hospital in the fields between Westminster and the City of London and now gives its name to the surrounding district of St Giles in the West End of London, situated between Seven Dials, Bloomsbury, Holborn and Soho. The present church is the third on the site since 1101 and was rebuilt most recently in 1731–1733 in Palladian style to designs by the architect Henry Flitcroft.

History

12th–16th centuries, hospital and chapel
The first recorded church on the site was a chapel of the Parish of Holborn attached to a monastery and leper hospital founded by Matilda of Scotland, consort of Henry I, in 1101. The foundation was attached as a "cell," or subordinate house, to a larger institution then recently founded at Burton Lazars, in Leicestershire. At the time it stood well outside the City of London and distant from the Royal Palace of Westminster, on the main road to Tyburn and Oxford. The chapel probably began to function as the church of a hamlet that grew up round the hospital. Although there is no record of any presentation to the living before the hospital was suppressed in 1539, the fact that the parish of St. Giles was in existence at least as early as 1222 means that the church was at least partially used for parochial purposes from that time.

The Precinct of the Hospital probably included the whole of the island site now bounded by High Street, Charing Cross Road and Shaftesbury Avenue. As well as the Hospital church which stood on the site of the present St Giles there would have been other buildings connected to the hospital including the Master's House (subsequently called the Mansion House) to the west of the church, and the 'Spittle Houses', dwellings attached to the Hospital on the eastern end of the present churchyard including the Angel Inn, which remains on the same site.

St Giles's position halfway between the ancient cities of Westminster and London is perhaps no coincidence. As George Water Thornbury noted in London Old & New "it is remarkable that in almost every ancient town in England, the church of St. Giles stands either outside the walls, or, at all events, near its outlying parts, in allusion, doubtless, to the arrangements of the Israelites of old, who placed their lepers outside the camp."

Under the Lazar brothers 
During the 12th century Pope Alexander IV confirmed the hospital's privileges and granted it his special protection. His bull reveals that the lepers were trying to live as a religious community and that the Hospital precinct included gardens and 8 acres of land adjoining the Hospital to the north and south. As a result of this Papal confirmation and protection, the religious community at St Giles's was exempted from the suspension of communion which occurred during the Papal Interdict of England in 1208–14. This means that the site had possibly been the sight of unbroken Christian worship for over 900 years when the church was closed for a period during the national COVID-19 Lockdown.

The hospital was supported by the Crown and administered by the City of London for its first 200 years, being known as a Royal Peculiar. In 1299, Edward I assigned it to Hospital of Burton Lazars in Leicestershire, a house of the order of St. Lazarus of Jerusalem, a chivalric order  from the era of the Crusades. The 14th century was turbulent for the hospital, with frequent accusations of corruption and mismanagement from the City and Crown authorities and suggestions that members of the Order of Saint Lazarus (known as Lazar brothers) put the affairs of the monastery ahead of caring for the lepers. In 1348 The Citizens contended to the King that since the Master and brothers of Burton Lazars had taken over St. Giles's the friars had ousted the lepers and replaced them by brothers and sisters of the Order of St. Lazarus, who were not diseased and ought not to associate with those who were. The Hospital appears to have been governed by a Warden, who was subordinate to the Master of Burton Lazars. The King intervened on several occasions and appointed a new head of the hospital.

Eventually, in 1391, Richard II sold the hospital, chapel and lands to the Cistercian abbey of St Mary de Graces by the Tower of London. This was opposed by the Lazars and their new Master, Walter Lynton, who responded by leading a group of armed men to St Giles, recapturing it by force, and by the City of London, which withheld rent money in protest. The dispute was finally settled in court with the King claiming he had been misled about the ownership of St Giles and recognising Lynton as legal Master of St Giles Hospital and the Hospital of Burton Lazarus with the Cistercian grant being formally revoked in 1402 and the property returned to the Lazar Brothers. 

The property at the time included  of farmland and a survey-enumerated eight horses, twelve oxen, two cows, 156 pigs, 60 geese and 186 domestic fowl. Lepers were cared for there until the mid-16th century, when the disease abated and the monastery took to caring for indigents instead. The Precinct of the Hospital probably included the whole of the site now bounded by St Giles High Street, Charing Cross Road and Shaftesbury Avenue; it was entered by a Gatehouse in St Giles High Street.

Lollardy and Oldcastle's Rising 

In 1414, St Giles Fields served as the centre of Sir John Oldcastle's abortive proto-Protestant Lollard uprising directed against the Catholic Church and the English king Henry V. In anticipation of Protestantism, Lollard beliefs were outlined in the 1395 The Twelve Conclusions of the Lollards which dealt with, among other things, their opposition to capital punishment, rejection of religious celibacy and belief that members of the clergy should be held accountable to civil laws. Rebel Lollards answered a summons to assemble among the 'dark thickets' by St. Giles's Fields on the night of Jan. 9, 1414. The King, however, was forewarned by his agents and the small group of Lollards in assembly were captured or dispersed. The rebellion brought severe reprisals and marked the end of the Lollards' overt political influence after many of the captured rebels were brutally executed. Of their number, 38 were dragged on hurdles through the streets from Newgate to St Giles on January 12 and hanged side by side in batches of four while the bodies of the seven who had been formally condemned as heretics by the Catholic Church were burned afterwards. Four more were hanged a week later. Finally, on 14 December 1417 Sir John Oldcastle himself was hanged in chains and burnt 'gallows and all' in St Giles Fields.

The famous scene of the meeting of the Lollards at St Giles Fields was later memorialised by Lord Tennyson in his poem Sir John Oldcastle, Lord Cobham:

16th century, dissolution of the Hospital of St Giles and the first parish church 
The hospital was dissolved in 1539 in the reign of Henry VIII, its lands, excluding the chapel, being granted to John Dudley, Lord Lisle in 1548. The chapel survived as the local parish church, the first Rector of St Giles being appointed in 1547 when the phrase "in the fields" was first added to the name.

Perhaps nothing remains of the medieval church of St Giles however we can reconstruct something of it's appearance from the historical record.

According to an order of the Vestry of 8th August, 1623, the medieval parish church stood 153 feet by 65 feet and consisted of a nave and a chancel, both with pillars and clerestory walls above and with aisles on either side. in the 46th year of Henry III or 1262 there is a record of a bequest by Robert of Portpool to the Hospital chapel providing for the maintenance of a chaplain "to celebrate perpetually divine service in the chapel of St. Michael within the hospital church of S. Giles.". Thus we may surmise that the church building was a tripartite structure likely consisting of aisles leading to separate chapels dedicated to St Michael and St Giles either side of central nave.

There is a further indication, in the Vestry minutes of 21st April, 1617 that there was a sort of round tower, spirelet or conical bell turret at the western end of the structure.

Intriguingly, the other remaining Medieval relic of the order of St. Lazarus of Jerusalem in England, the 12th century Church of St James which now serves as the parish church of Burton Lazars, Leicestershire, appears quite closely to resemble the description of what St Giles may have looked like in it's medieval state.

17th century, Duchess Dudley's church
By the second decade of the 17th century the Medieval church had suffered a series of collapses and the parishioners decided to erect a new church which was begun 1623 and completed in 1630. It was consecrated on 26 January 1630. mostly paid for by the Duchess of Dudley, wife of Sir Robert Dudley. The 'poor players of The Cockpit theatre' were also said to have contributed a sum of £20 towards the new church building. The new church was handsomely appointed and sumptuously furnished. 123 feet long and the breadth 57 wide with a steeple in rubbed brick, galleries adorning the north and south aisles with a great east window of coloured and painted glass.

The new building was consecrated by William Laud, Bishop of London. An illuminated list of subscribers to the rebuilding is still kept in the church.

Civil War and sectarian conflict 
The ruptures in church and state which would eventually lead to the Civil War were felt early in St Giles Parish. In 1628 the first Rector of the newly consecrated church, Roger Maynwaring was fined and deprived of his clerical functions by order of Parliament after two sermons, given on the 4th of May, which were considered to have impugned the rights of Parliament and advocated for the Divine Right of the Stuart Kings.

The controversy would be continued into the 1630s when Archbishop Laud's former chaplain, William Heywood, was installed as Rector. It was Heywood, under Laud's patronage, who began to ornament and decorate St Giles in the High Church, Laudian fashion and to alter the ceremonial of the sacraments. This provoked the Protestant parishioners of St Giles to present Parliament with a petition listing and enumerating the 'popish reliques' with which Heywood had set up 'at needless expense to the parish' as well as the 'Superstitious and Idolatrous manner of administration of the Sacrament of the Lords Supper'. The offending ceremonial was closely described by the parishioners in their complaint to parliament:
At this time the interior was heavily furnished by Heywood and provided with numerous ornaments, many of which were the gift of Alice Dudley, Duchess of Dudley. Chief among them was an elaborate screen of carved oak placed where one had formerly stood in the Medieval church. This, as described in the petition to Parliament in 1640, was "in the figure of a beautiful gate, in which is carved two large pillars, and three large statues: on the one side is Paul, with his sword; on the other Barnabas, with his book; and over them Peter with his keyes. They are all set above with winged cherubims, and beneath supported by lions."Elaborate and expensive altar rails would have separated the altar from congregation. This ornamental balustrade extended the full width of the chancel and stood 7 or 8 feet east of the screen at the top of three steps while the altar stood close up to the east wall paved with marble.

The result of the parishioners petition to Parliament was that most of the ornaments were stripped and sold in 1643, while Lady Dudley was still alive.

Dr Heywood was still the incumbent at the time of the outbreak of the Great Rebellion in 1642. As well as Rector of St Giles he had, of course, been a domestic chaplain to Archbishop Laud, chaplain in ordinary to King Charles I and prebendary at St Paul's cathedral. All this marked him out for special attention after the execution of the King and during the Commonwealth period he was imprisoned and suffered many hardships. Heywood was forced to flee London, residing in Wiltshire until the Restoration of the monarchy in 1660 when he was finally re-instated to the living of St Giles.

In 1650, a year after the murder of the King and with the fall of the monarchy seemingly irreversibly settled, an order was given for the 'taking down of the Kings Arms' in the church and the clear-glazing of the windows in the nave.

Revd. John Sharp and the Glorious Revolution 
In 1660 Charles II was rapturously received back into London and the bells of St Giles were pealed for three days. Royalism was at its highest pitch. William Heywood was reinstated to his living for a short period before being succeeded by the Dr Robert Boreman, Clerk of the Green Cloth to Charles I and fellow deprived Royalist. He would be incidentally notorious for his bitter exchange with Richard Baxter the Nonconformist leader and occasional parishioner of St Giles.

In 1675 Dr. John Sharp was appointed to the position of Rector by the influence and patronage of Heneage Finch, 1st Earl of Nottingham and Lord Keeper of the Great Seal. Sharp's father had been a prominent Bradfordian puritan who enjoyed the favour of Thomas Fairfax and inculcated him in Calvinist, Low Church, doctrines, while his mother, being strong Royalist, instructed him in the liturgy of the Book of Common Prayer. Thus he could be seen as bridging the divide within the reformed religion in England. Sharp became deeply committed to his ministry at St Giles and indeed later declined the more profitable benefice of St Martin in the Fields so as to continue ministering to the poor and turbulent parish of St Giles.The Rector would spend the next sixteen years reforming and reconstituting the parish from the disorder of the post civil war period. He preached regularly (at least twice every Sunday at St Giles as well as weekly in other city churches) and with "much fluency, piety [and] gravity", becoming, according to Bishop Burnet "one of the most popular preachers of the age". Sharp completely re-ordered the system of worship at St Giles around the Established Liturgy of the Book Of Common Prayer, a liturgy he considered "almost perfectly designed". He instituted, perhaps for the first time, a weekly Holy Communion and restored the Daily Offices in the church. Sharp also insisted upon communicants kneeling to receive communion. In the wider parish he was constant in his catechising of young people and in performing visitations of the sick, often at the hazard of his own life. Somehow he avoided serious illness despite "bear[ing] his share of duty among the cellars and the garrets" of a district already synonymous with plague and sickness. Indeed, his solicitude for his parishioners left him at risk in many ways. He once survived an attempted assassination by Jacobite agents constructed around the pretence of luring him to visit a dying parishioner. He attended with an armed servant and the "parishioner" staged an "instant recovery".

In 1685 Sharp was tasked by the Lord Mayor with drawing up for the Grand Jury of London their address of congratulations on the accession of James II and on 20 April 1686 he became chaplain in ordinary to the King. However, provoked by the subversion of his parishioners faith by Jesuit priests and Jacobite agents, Sharp preached two sermons at St. Giles on 2 and 9 May, which were held to reflect adversely on the King's religious policy. As a result, Henry Compton, bishop of London, was ordered by the Lord President of the Council, to summarily suspend Sharp from his position at St Giles. Compton refused, but in an interview at Doctors' Commons on 18 May privately advised Sharp to "forbear the pulpit" for the present. On 1 July, by the advice of Judge Jeffreys, he left London for Norwich; but when he returned to London in December his petition, revised by Jeffreys, was received, and in January 1687 he was reinstated.

In August 1688 Sharp was again in trouble. After refusing to read the declaration of indulgence he summoned before the ecclesiastical commission of James II. He argued that though obedience was due to the king in preference to the archbishop, yet that obedience went no further than what was legal and honest. After the Glorious Revolution he visited the imprisoned 'Bloody' Jeffreys in the Tower of London and attempted to bring him to penitence and consolation for his crimes.

Soon after the Revolution Sharp preached before the Prince of Orange (soon to be King William III) and three days later before the Convention Parliament. On each occasion he included prayers for King James II on the ground that the lords had not yet concurred in the abdication. On 7 September 1689 he was named dean of Canterbury succeeding John Tillotson.

18th–19th centuries, the Henry Flitcroft church

St.Giles's Parish enjoys the unfortunate distinction of having originated the Great Plague of 1665. It is on record that the first persons seized were members of a family living near the top of Drury Lane, where two men, said to have been Frenchmen, were attacked by it, and speedily carried off.

The high number of plague victims buried in and around the church were the probable cause of a damp problem evident by 1711. The excessive number of burials in the parish had led to the churchyard rising as much as eight feet above the nave floor. The parishioners petitioned the Commission for Building Fifty New Churches for a grant to rebuild. Initially refused as it was not a new foundation and the Act was intended for new parishes in under-churched areas, the parish was eventually allocated £8,000 (around £1.2 Million adjusted for 2023 prices) and a new church was built in 1730–1734, designed by architect Henry Flitcroft in the Palladian style. The first stone was laid by the Bishop of Norwich on Michaelmas, 29 September 1731.

The Flitcroft rebuilding represents a shift from the Baroque to the Palladian form of church building in England and has been described as 'one of the least known but most significant episodes in Georgian church design, standing at a crucial crossroads of radical architectural change and representing nothing less than the first Palladian-Revival church to be erected in London...". Nicholas Hawksmoor had been an early choice to design the new church building at St Giles but tastes had begun to turn against his freewheeling mannerist style (his recent work on the nearby St George's Bloomsbury was strongly criticised). Instead the young and inexperienced Henry Flitcroft was chosen and he would take as his inspiration and guide the Caroline buildings of Inigo Jones rather than the work of Wren, Hawksmoor or Gibbs. Only in the matter of the spire of the church, for which Palladio had no model, did Flitcroft borrow as his model the steeple of James Gibbs's St Martin's in the Fields but even then, in altering the Order and preferring a solid, belted summit, he made it all his own. The wooden model he made so that parishioners could see what they were commissioning, can still be seen in the church's north transept. The Vestry House was built at the same time.

As London grew in the 18th and 19th centuries, so did the parish's population, eventually reaching 30,000 by 1831 which suggests an extremely high density. It included two neighbourhoods noted for poverty and squalor: the St Giles Rookery between the church and Great Russell Street, and the Seven Dials north of Long Acre. These became a centre for criminality and prostitution and the name St Giles became associated with the underworld, gambling houses and the consumption of gin. St Giles's Roundhouse was a gaol and St Giles' Greek a thieves' cant. As the population grew, so did their dead, and eventually there was no room in the graveyard: many burials of parishioners (including the architect Sir John Soane) in the 18th and 19th centuries took place outside the parish in the churchyard of St Pancras old church

John Wesley, the English cleric, theologian, and evangelist and leader of a revival movement within the Church of England known as Methodism is believed to have preached occasionally at Evening Prayer at St Giles from the large pulpit dating from 1676 which survived the rebuild and, indeed, is still in use today. Also retained in the church is a smaller whitewashed box-pulpit originally belonging to the nearby West Street Chapel used by both John and Charles Wesley to preach the Gospel.

The dissolute nature of the area in the middle part of the 19th Century is described in Charles Dickens' Sketches by Boz.

Architects Sir Arthur Blomfield and William Butterfield made minor alterations to the church interior in 1875 and 1896.

20th century, war damage and restoration 
Although St Giles escaped direct bombing hits in the Second World War, high explosives still destroyed most of its Victorian stained glass and the roof of the nave was severely damaged. The Vestry house was filled with rubble and the churchyard was fenced with chicken wire, while the Rectory on Great Russell Street had been entirely destroyed. The Parish itself was in as parlous a state with the theft of the PCC funds and the surrounding area ruined and parishioners dispersed by war. Into this position the Revd Gordon Taylor was appointed Rector and set about energetically rebuilding the church and parish.

The church was designated a Grade I listed building on 24 October 1951 and Revd. Gordon Taylor raised funds for a major restoration of the church undertaken between 1952 and 1953. It adhered closely to Flitcroft's original intentions, on which the Georgian Group and Royal Fine Art Commission were consulted The resulting works were praised by the journalist and poet John Betjeman as "one of the most successful post-war church restorations" (Spectator 9 March 1956). Revd. Gordon Taylor slowly rebuilt the congregation, refurbished the St Giles's Alms­houses and reinvigorated the ancient parochial charities. He also worked successfully with Austen Williams of St Martin-in-the-Fields to defeat the comprehensive redevelopment of Covent Garden, stopping the construction of a major road planned to run through the parish, which would have involved the demolition of the Almshouses and the destruction of this historic quarter of London, personally giving evidence before the public inquiry.

Rev. Taylor eventually came to see himself as a defender and custodian of what he saw as the traditions of the Church of England, the Established Liturgy and the use of the Book of Common Prayer which he maintained in the Parish.

St Giles churchyard 
The churchyard and burying place lies to the south of the church building on the site of the original burial yard of the Leper Hospital. The churchyard, which holds many centuries of dead, buried on top of each other, was frequently enlarged with overcrowding a perennial problem. A 19th-century historian of London's burial grounds described conditions at the beginning of that century thus:

The first victims of the 1665 Great Plague were buried in St Giles's Churchyard. By the end of the plague year there were 3,216 listed deaths in a church parish with fewer than 2,000 households.

A plot of land named Brown's Gardens was added to the churchyard in 1628 and in 1803 an additional burial-ground, adjoining that of St. Pancras was purchased, where the St Giles parishioner Sir John Soane is buried.

Roman Catholic burials 
The Churchyard of St Giles may be said to enjoy a particular significance and reverence in the hearts and minds of Roman Catholics. One has gone as far as to describe it as "London's most Hallowed Space". As the ground was originally consecrated by a Roman Catholic and, indeed, later placed under the special protection of Pope Alexander IV it is still considered "hallowed ground" and was thus considered an acceptable place of burial for and by Roman Catholics during the time of the penal laws in England. It has therefore been the burial place of a number of distinguished Roman Catholics since the Reformation as well as many thousands of poor and nameless Irish Catholic immigrants to London.

During the religious conflicts of the 17th century a number of notable Roman Catholic figures were interred there including John Belasyse, 1st Baron Belasyse, Richard Penderel and James Radcliffe, 3rd Earl of Derwentwater (executed at Tower Hill after the failure of the Jacobite Rebellion of 1715)

A number of Roman Catholic priests and laymen, executed for High Treason on the false testimony of Titus Oates during the fictitious conspiracy and panic known as the Popish Plot, were buried near the church's north wall following their executions:

These included
Oliver Plunkett, Archbishop of Armagh, buried (according to the parish register) on 1 July 1681, but exhumed in 1683 and taken to Lamspringe Abbey in Germany. Later it was moved again. His head went to Rome, was then given to the Archbishop of Armagh, and is now at Drogheda. His body rests at Downside Abbey, Somerset.
The five Jesuit fathers with whom Plunkett asked to be buried:
Thomas Whitbread, William Harcourt, John Fenwick, John Gavan and Anthony Turner (martyr)
Edward Coleman (or Colman), secretary to the Duchess of York
Richard Langhorne, barrister
Edward Micó, priest, who died soon after arrest. He was the only one of the twelve martyrs not to be executed at Tyburn.
William Ireland, kinsman of Richard Penderel.
John Grove, priest
Thomas Pickering, lay brother
All 12 were later beatified by Pope Pius XI while Oliver Plunkett was canonised by Pope Paul VI in 1975.A memorial for the seven Jesuits and all those buried within the churchyard was unveiled on 20 January 2019.

Fr Lawrence Lew O.P. of the Roman Catholic Diocese of Westminster has described the place thus:

Richard Penderel's tomb 
Standing among the bushes at the south corner of the east end of the church is the tomb of Richard Penderel, a West Country Yeoman instrumental in the escape of Charles II after the Battle of Worcester in 1651. Richard cut the king's hair, dressed him in country garb and hid the king in the branches of the Royal Oak to escape his pursuers. Upon the Restoration Richard was rewarded with a pension and visited court once a year, lodging at Great Turnstile off Lincolns Inn. Here in February 1671–2 he caught the "St Giles Fever" and was buried beneath a splendid chest tomb. The tomb was "repaired and beautified" by order of George II in 1739 but later fell into decay.

The inscription on the side of the tomb is still faintly visible and reads:

In 1922 the tomb slab, by now deteriorating in its exposed position, was moved inside the church and is now mounted in the west end of the church building alongside the famous Royalist hero of Edgehill, Newbury and Naseby, John Lord Belasyse.

The Resurrection Gate 
At the western end of the churchyard facing Flitcroft Street stands the Resurrection Gate, a grand lychgate in the Doric order. It formerly stood on the north side of the churchyard, to be gazed upon by the condemned prisoner on his way to execution at Tyburn.

The Gate is adorned with a bas-relief of the Day of Judgement. The carving is probably the work of a wood-carver named  Mr Love and was commissioned in 1686 when directions were given by the vestry to erect "a substantial gate out of the wall of the churchyard near the round house".

Rowland Dobie, in his "History of St. Giles'", states that "the composition is, with various alterations, taken from Michael Angelo's 'Last Judgment' however Mr. J. T. Smith, in his "Book for a Rainy Day", says of the carving that it was "borrowed, not from Michael Angelo, but from the workings of the brain of some ship-carver".

The Gate was rebuilt in 1810 to the designs of the architect and churchwarden of St Giles William Leverton and, In 1865, being unsafe, it was taken down and carefully re-erected opposite the west door in anticipation of the re-routing of Charing Cross Road. As it happened Charing Cross road bypassed Flitcroft Street and now the gate faces onto a narrow alleyway.

Features of interest

Organ
The first 17th-century organ was destroyed in the English Civil War. George Dallam built a replacement in 1678, which was rebuilt in 1699 by Christian Smith, a nephew of the great organ builder "Father" Smith. A second rebuilding in the new structure was done in 1734 by Gerard Smith the younger, possibly assisted by Johann Knopple. Much of the pipework from 1678 and 1699 was recycled.

A rebuilding, again recycling much of Dallam's original pipework, was done in 1856 by London organ builders Gray & Davison, then at the height of their fame. In 1960 the mechanical key and stop actions were replaced with an electro-pneumatic action. This was removed when the organ was extensively restored in a historically informed manner by William Drake, completing in 2006. Drake put back tracker action and preserved as much old pipework as possible, with new pipework in a 17th-century style.

Wesley's pulpit 
In the east end of the north aisle there is a small box pulpit from which both John and Charles Wesley, the leaders of the Methodist movement, were known to preach.

Now whitewashed with a memorial inscription, it represents only the top part of a 'triple decker' pulpit which Wesley would have used in the nearby West Street Chapel. Wesley had taken on the lease of the building off of a dwindling Huguenot congregation and it remained with the Methodists until his death in 1791.

Also known to preach from within this pulpit were George Whitfield and John William Fletcher.  At the beginning of the 19th Century the chapel was taken on by the Church of England, becoming All Saints West Street, and later closed for worship whereupon the pulpit was removed and preserved at St Giles.

Font 
Dating from 1810 the white marble font with Greek Revival detailing is noted by Pevsner as being attributed to the architect and designer Sir John Soane.

On 9 March 1818 William and Clara Everina Shelley were baptised in this font in the presence of the novelist Mary Wollstonecraft Shelley (née Godwin) and her husband, the poet Percy Bysshe Shelley. Also baptised that day was Allegra the illegitimate daughter of Mary's step-sister Claire Clairmont and the poet Lord Byron. Part of the group's haste in baptising the children together, along with Percy's debts, ill-health and fears over the custody of his own children, was the desire to take Allegra to her father, Lord Byron, then in Venice. 
All three children were to die in childhood in Italy. After the premature death of the toddler Allegra Byron, at the age of 5, a grieving Shelley portrayed the toddler as Count Maddalo's child in his 1819 poem Julian and Maddalo: A Conversation:

Shelley himself was never to return to England, drowning off the coast of Leghorn in 1822.

The "Poet's Church"
St Giles has in recent times come to be referred to as the "Poets' Church" on account of connections to several poets and dramatists beginning in the 16th Century.

An early post-reformation Rector, Nathaniel Baxter was both clergyman and poet. In earlier life he had been tutor to Sir Philip Sidney, and interested in the manner of Sidney's circle in literature and Ramist logic,. He is now remembered for his 1606 poem Ourania.

The poor players of the Cockpit Theatre are said to have contributed £20 to the building of the second church on the site before their suppression by Parliament in 1642.

James Shirley and Thomas Nabbes, two noted English playwrights of the 17th Century were buried within the church. Both were writers of city comedies and historical tragedies. Shirley was perhaps the most prolific and highly regarded dramatist of the reign of King Charles I, writing 31 plays, 3 masques, and 3 moral allegories. He is remembered for his comedies of fashionable London life and is perhaps best known for his poem 'Death the Leveller' at the close of his Contention of Ajax and Ulysses which begins:

Also buried in the churchyard was Michael Mohun, a leading English actor both before and after the 1642–60 closing of the theatres.

A memorial in the church commemorates George Chapman (died 1634), intimate friend of Ben Jonson, the translator of Homer and writer of masques, who is buried outside in the churchyard. His memorial was designed by Inigo Jones, who produced the masques to Chapman's texts, and paid for by Jones because Chapman died in dire poverty. Chapman is perhaps equally famous as forming part of the subject of John Keats's sonnet 'On first looking into Chapman's Homer'.

The politician, pamphleteer and metaphysical poet Andrew Marvell (died 1678) was buried and memorialised in St Giles as is Edward Herbert, 1st Baron Herbert of Cherbury (died 1648) (poet-philosopher and brother of the poet George Herbert), who in 1624 published his controversial metaphysical treatise De Veritate on the advice of the philosopher Hugo Grotius (it remains on the Catholic index of forbidden books).

Sir Roger L' Estrange, buried and memorialised at St Giles, was the last Surveyor of the Press in England as well as Licenser of the Press until 1672 - effectively a national literary censor. He earned the title of "Bloodhound of the Press" thanks to his careful monitoring and control of nonconformist ideas and opinions and succeeded not only in checking seditious publications, but also in limiting political controversy and reducing debate. He is remembered for attempting to suppress the following lines from Book I of Milton's Paradise Lost, for potentially impugning the Kings Majesty:

John Milton's daughter Mary was baptised in the second church building in 1647; whilst the daughter of Lord Byron, Clara and the son William and daughter Clara of the poet Percy Shelley by his marriage to Mary Wollstonecraft Godwin were all baptised in the present St Giles church font. The Poetry Society holds its annual general meeting in St Giles Vestry House.

The St Giles Bowl 
By at least the early 15th Century the chief site of public execution in London was moved from the Elms at Smithfield to the northwest corner of the wall of the hospital of St Giles (now the junction of Flitcroft Street and Denmark Street) where a gallows was erected. It became the custom of the Hospital to present the condemned man with a draught strong ale, described in a later ballad as a 'broad wooden bowl' of 'nutty brown ale' to ease his passing into the next life. This became known as the 'St Giles Bowl'. After the dissolution of the Hospital and the further moving of the site of execution to the newly built triple gallows at Tyburn the custom was kept up by the churchwardens of St Giles.

In his “Survey of London” of 1598, the antiquarian John Stow remarked “At this hospital the prisoners conveyed from the City of London towards Tyburn, there to be executed for treasons, felonies or other trespasses, were presented with a great bowl of ale, thereof to drink at their pleasure, as to be their last refreshing in this life”. Walter Thornbury later remarked in London Old and New that "there is scarcely an execution at "Tyburn Tree," recorded in the "Newgate Calendar," in which the fact is not mentioned that the culprit called at a public-house en route for a parting draught".

The 'public house' mentioned appears to have been on the current site of the Angel (it is confusingly named The Crown in many ballads and stories) now owned by Samuel Smith's brewery of Tadcaster. The earliest documented reference to the Angel Inn comes at the time dissolution of the Hospital of St Giles in 1539 when the Inn was transferred to Miss Katherine Legh, later Lady Mountjoy. At the time of the rebuilding of the Angel In 1873, the London City Press reported that:

"another memorial of ancient London was about to pass away, namely, the "Angel" Inn, at St. Giles's, the "half-way house" on the road to Tyburn—the house at which Jack Ketch and the criminal who was about to expiate his offence on the scaffold were wont to stop on their way to the gallows for a "last glass." Mr. W. T. Purkiss, the proprietor, however, was prevailed upon to stay the work of demolition for a time."

Many famous felons and highwaymen took the St Giles Bowl at the sign of the Angel including John Cottington 'Mulsack' who picked Cromwell's pocket, John Nevison 'Swift-Neck', and 'Handsome' Tom Cox who robbed the Kings Jester, Thomas Killgrew. Perhaps the most famous scene to occur over the St Giles Bowl was the procession of the thief and popular hero 'Honest Jack' Sheppard to Tyburn accompanied by as many as 200,000 citizens. According to one fictionalised telling, Sheppard refused the Bowl and instead pledged that his persecutor, the corrupt thief taker Jonathon Wild, would taste of the cup within six months. Six months later Wild was executed for theft at Tyburn.

The Victorian historical novelist William Harrison Ainsworth composed a ballad and drinking song on the history of the St Giles Cup beginning:

"Where Saint Giles's Church stands, once a lazar-house stood;

And chained to its gates was a vessel of wood;

A broad-bottomed bowl, from which all the fine fellows,

Who passed by that spot on their way to the gallows,

Might tipple strong beer Their spirits to cheer,

And drown in a sea of good liquor all fear !

For nothing the transit to Tyburn beguiles

So well as a draught from the Bowl of Saint Giles !"

Memorials at St Giles

Distinguished people with memorials in St Giles include:
Richard Penderel, Roman Catholic yeoman forester who accompanied king Charles II on his famous escape from the Battle of Worcester
Lord Belasyse, a noted Roman Catholic Royalist Lieutenant General.
Sir Roger L'Estrange,  English pamphleteer, author, courtier and the last Surveyor of the Press of England.
Andrew Marvell, English metaphysical poet, satirist and politician.
John Flaxman RA, sculptor and draughtsman, and a leading figure in British and European Neoclassicism.
Luke Hansard, printer to the House of Commons
Thomas Earnshaw, watchmaker who simplified the production of the marine chronometer making them available to the general public for the first time.
Arthur William Devis, English history painter whose most famous work was of the Death of Nelson, now in the National Maritime Museum at Greenwich.
James Shirley 17th Century English dramatist. House dramatist to Queen Henrietta's Men.
Thomas Nabbes, 17th Century English dramatist and writer of masques.
Edward Herbert, 1st Baron Herbert of Cherbury, Anglo-Welsh soldier, diplomat, historian, poet and religious philosopher. "the father of English Deism".
George Chapman, English dramatist, translator and poet.
Cecil Calvert, first Proprietor of the Colony of Avalon in 1610 and the Maryland colony in 1633. (Some of the colonists were from St Giles's parish.) His memorial was unveiled on 10 May 1996 by the Governor of Maryland, Parris N. Glendening. Calvert, his son and daughters-in-law are buried at St Giles.
William Balmain, one of the founders of New South Wales and Principal Surgeon of the Colony, has a memorial on the north-west wall, put up by the Balmain Society of Sydney in 1996.
John Lumsden of Cushnie, member of the Bengal Supreme Council and made director of the East India Company in 1817.
John Coleridge Patteson, Born in St Giles Parish he became a missionary, anti-slavery campaigner in the South Seas and first Anglican Bishop of Melanesia. Martyred on the island of Nukapu, he is commemorated in the Church of England calendar on 20 September.

HMS Indefatigable White Ensign 

HMS Indefatigable was the adopted ship of Metropolitan Borough of Holborn. Following a request by the HMS Indefatigable association in 1989 the London Borough of Camden (which had succeeded the Holborn in 1965) agreed the laying up of the ensign in St Giles in the presence of the ship's company from the Second World War.

Other features
The two paintings of Moses and Aaron on either side of the altar are by Francisco Vieira the Younger, court painter to the King of Portugal.

The mosaic Time, Death and Judgment by G. F. Watts was formerly in St Jude's Church, Whitechapel. The cartoon for it was by Cecil Schott; it was executed by Salviati.

The great stained glass window at the east end of the church, over the Lords Table depicts the transfiguration of Christ on mount Tabor.

Parish activities

Worship 
The church is open daily for quiet prayer and reflection, with morning prayer said daily at 8.15am, and said Holy Communion on Wednesdays at 1 pm. On Sundays, the two services are Sung Eucharist at 11 am and Evensong at 6.30 pm. Services are conducted in accordance with the Book of Common Prayer of 1662 and the King James Bible. St Giles is also a corporate member of the Prayer Book Society. St Giles also regularly conducts Weddings, Baptisms and Funerals.

Church music is provided by a professional quartet of singers at Sunday morning services. At Evensong it comes from a voluntary choir, founded in 2005, which is open to all and has up to 30 members. The choir has traveled widely to sing at cathedrals, including Norwich, Exeter, St Albans and Guildford.

Mission 
Together with the neighbouring parish of St George's Bloomsbury the St Giles & St George Charities focus on alleviating hardship and supporting educational achievement in the area.  The charities provide grants to local schools and educational initiatives, almshouse accommodation in Covent Garden and small grants to people experiencing hardship and homelessness. These charities are the modern successors of a number of historic foundations established in the St Giles area.

The Simon Community provides a weekly Street Cafe outside the church every Saturday and Sunday. Quaker Homeless Action provide a lending library at St Giles to people who would otherwise not have access to books every Saturday. Street Storage provides a facility to allow homeless people to store their possessions, which might otherwise be at risk of theft.  Alcoholics Anonymous and Narcotics Anonymous

There is regular bell-ringing practice on Tuesday nights. The bells were cast in the 17th and 18th centuries.

Rectors of St Giles from 1547

See also

St Lawrence's Church, Mereworth, the spire of which is a copy of St Giles in the Fields.
Holy Cross Church, Daventry is also said to have been modelled on St Giles in the Fields.
St James's Church Burton Lazars.

References

Further reading

Church's own site

18th-century Church of England church buildings
Church of England church buildings in the London Borough of Camden
Diocese of London
Grade I listed churches in London
Neoclassical architecture in London
Rebuilt churches in the United Kingdom
St Giles, London
Neoclassical church buildings in England